Louis-Marc-Michel, comte de Chappedelaine (21 June 1876, Saint-Just, Ille-et-Vilaine – 9 December 1939, Ville-d'Avray, Seine-et-Oise) was a French politician. He served as a member of the Chamber of Deputies from 1910 to 1939, representing Côtes-du-Nord. He was the Minister of Merchant Marine from 27 January to 16 February 1932, Minister of Colonies from 20 February to 10 May 1932, Minister of Military Marine from 30 January to 7 February 1934, Minister of Merchant Marine from 24 January to 4 June 1936, and again from 10 April 1938 to 13 September 1939.

References

1876 births
1939 deaths
People from Ille-et-Vilaine
Politicians from Brittany
Popular Liberal Action politicians
Independent Radical politicians
French Ministers of Merchant Marine
Members of the 10th Chamber of Deputies of the French Third Republic
Members of the 11th Chamber of Deputies of the French Third Republic
Members of the 12th Chamber of Deputies of the French Third Republic
Members of the 13th Chamber of Deputies of the French Third Republic
Members of the 14th Chamber of Deputies of the French Third Republic
Members of the 15th Chamber of Deputies of the French Third Republic
Members of the 16th Chamber of Deputies of the French Third Republic